Paul Haarhuis and Sjeng Schalken were the defending champions, but did not participate this year.

Sergio Roitman and Andrés Schneiter won in the final 4–6, 6–4, 6–1, against Edwin Kempes and Dennis van Scheppingen.

Seeds

Draw

Draw

External links
Draw

Dutch Open (tennis)
2000 ATP Tour
2000 Dutch Open (tennis)